Kuda Bux (17 February 1905 – 5 February 1981), born Khudah Bukhsh, was a Pakistani mystic, magician and firewalker.

Performances

Blindfolds
In one of his best known performances he would cover his eyes with soft dough balls, blindfold himself, swath his entire head in strips of cloth, and yet still be able to see.

Bux was the star of a 1950 TV series titled Kuda Bux, Hindu Mystic, and his apparent ability to see while blindfolded with dough balls strongly influenced British author Roald Dahl in his short story "The Wonderful Story of Henry Sugar", about a man who was taught to develop the same powers. Observers noted that without a blindfold Bux required reading glasses to read fine print. While blindfolded he would read the dates on coins which were held in a spectator's hand, read the fine print of a magazine, thread a needle while covered in a wine barrel, duplicate words he had never seen written, shoot a can on children's heads with a pellet gun and many other tricks, such as those with a blindfold. Bux once cycled along Broadway in New York City while blindfolded.

Firewalking
According to Robert Ripley, Bux performed a trick in NBC Radio City Studios in Manhattan on 2 August 1938. According to this account, a  hole was dug in the Radio City parking lot and wooden logs and bags of charcoal were set on fire in it. Bux allegedly walked back and forth through the pit—twice. Ripley said, "Kuda Bux's feet were not even warm." There is newsreel footage of this event in the TV biography The Incredible Life and Times of Robert Ripley: Believe It or Not! (TBS 1993).

In 1935 Bux demonstrated firewalking in front of an audience of scientists from the University of London Council for Psychical Research and news reporters. He walked across a  pit of burning hot coals unscathed. Bux's feet were checked before and after the firewalking demonstration to verify that no protective chemicals, topical creams or herbs were used. After Bux walked through the coals, a cameraman who had messed up some photographs of the event asked for a retake. Bux obliged by repeating the firewalk. Again, his feet were checked before and after the firewalking demonstration.

Bux's firewalking ability amazed western audiences in the 1930s. Harry Price suggested that the feat was performed by specific placement of the feet. However, the mentalist Joseph Dunninger gave a more logical explanation. He pointed out that charcoal cooled down rapidly and by walking quickly on it, one could avoid being burned.

Personal life
Khudah Bukhsh was a balu born in Akhnur, Kashmir in 1905 ,to an ethnic Kashmiri family. His father worked as a railway ticket inspector. Bukhsh later became a Pakistani citizen. In the mid-1930s, he arrived in the United States where he pursued his practice of magic. When he was thirteen, he set out to learn magic from Professor Moor, a famous magician at the time. He eventually met Banerjee in Hardwar, a yogi who taught him fire walking and seeing without his eyes. In his later life, he lost his eyesight to glaucoma. He was also known as DareDevil or The Man Who Can See Without His Eyes. He died in 1981 in his sleep, aged 75.

References

External links
Kuda Bux, Hindu Mystic at IMDB
Archives on Kuda Bux in the Harry Price papers

1905 births
1981 deaths
Muslim mystics
Pakistani expatriates in the United States
Pakistani magicians
Pakistani people of Kashmiri descent
People from Jammu district
Place of death missing